The XIX Army Corps was a military formation of the People's Army of the Republic that fought during the Spanish Civil War. Located on the Teruel Front, it took part in the Teruel and Levante campaigns.

History 
The unit was created on August 2, 1937 using some forces from the XIII Army Corps as a base. Both formations were assigned to the Levantine Army on August 19, 1937, covering various sectors of the Teruel front. The General Staff of the XIII Army Corps was located in Torrebaja, a town in Valencian Rincón de Ademuz located south of Teruel. Its first commander was Manuel Eixea Vilar, succeeded on November 15, 1937 by Joaquín Vidal Munárriz. Meanwhile Aurelio Matilla Jimeno acted as chief of staff.

Some of its units took part in the Battle of Teruel. Later, in the spring and summer of 1938, it had a prominent participation during the Levante campaign, cooperating with the XIII, XVI, XVII, XX and XXII Army Corps to stop the Francoist offensive on Valencia. It did not intervene in relevant operations for the remainder of the conflict.

Command 
Commanders
 Manuel Eixea Vilar;
 Joaquín Vidal Munárriz;

Commissars
 Carlos Sanz Asensio, of the CNT;

Chiefs of Staff
 Aurelio Matilla Jimeno;
 José Guarner Vivancos;
 Ricardo Vivas García;
 Aurelio Matilla Jimeno;

Organization

Notes

References

Bibliography
 
 
 
 
 
 
 
 

Military units and formations established in 1937
Military units and formations disestablished in 1939
Corps of Spain
Military units and formations of the Spanish Civil War
Military history of Spain
Armed Forces of the Second Spanish Republic
1937 establishments in Spain
1939 disestablishments in Spain